Eric Longworth (20 July 1918 – 20 August 2008) was an English actor, best known for his semi-regular role in the BBC comedy Dad's Army as Mr. Gordon, the town clerk of Walmington-on-Sea.

Eric Groves Longworth was born in Shaw and Crompton, Lancashire. He had decided from an early age to become an actor, but had his hopes dashed when his father died and he had to help support the family. He was 17 at the time. Up to his call-up in 1939 at the outbreak of World War II, which included a spell in Bombay, he had joined the Crompton Stage Society, a local amateur company, playing character parts to stall his ambitions.

After being demobbed he decided to turn professional, joining the Oldham Coliseum Theatre, and staying with them for 11 years. He rose to become theatre manager at Oldham, and later became the manager of the old Guildford Theatre until 1963; at both theatres he continued to act, and occasionally direct, as well as managing. His first television appearance was in 1963, and he was usually cast as civil servants or retired colonels.

Longworth appeared in a 1972 episode of Lollipop written by Jimmy Perry, which could have led to his being chosen for the part of the Walmington-on-Sea Town Clerk. During the Dad's Army Stage Show, Longworth understudied (but, as he states, was thankfully never used for) Arthur Lowe. He also made a few films, and spent time flying around the globe visiting family, mixed in with the occasional voice over work, and appearances for the DAAS. He also appeared in another Jimmy Perry and David Croft sitcom Hi-de-Hi! as a Head Waiter. He was active from 1963 to 1996.

He had been a regular at Dad's Army events over the years. His most recent public appearance was at the Dad's Army 40th Birthday celebrations at the Imperial War Museum in London shortly before his death.

He died on 20 August 2008 in Peterborough, Cambridgeshire, one month after his 90th birthday. His funeral was held on 5 September.

Film roles
 'Turn-up for Tony''' (1968, TV film) - Foreman
 All Neat in Black Stockings (1968) - Businessman
 Foreign Exchange (1970, TV film) - Boreman
 Perfect Friday (1970) - House of Lords Messenger
 Ooh… You Are Awful (1972) - Passport Booth Customer (uncredited)
 No Sex Please, We're British (1973) - Man with Lighter
 The Bawdy Adventures of Tom Jones (1976) - Man at Ball (uncredited)Die Katze von Kensington  (1996, TV film)

Television rolesNo Hiding Place (1963) - 1st Businessman ITV Television Playhouse (1963) - Mr Pickwick Martin Chuzzlewit (1964) - Second Card PlayerUnited! (1966) - Gerald Compton - recurring character 
Boy Meets Girl (1967–69) - PolicemanITV Play of the Week (1967) - Shop assistant 
The First Lady (1968) - EarnshawCoronation Street (1967–76) - Nat Lumley - recurring characterDad's Army (1972–77) - Town Clerk - recurring character

References

External links
 
 Obituary in The Telegraph Obituary in The Times''

1918 births
2008 deaths
English male television actors
People from Shaw and Crompton
Actor-managers
20th-century theatre managers
British military personnel of World War II